Konya is a major city in central Turkey, on the southwestern edge of the Central Anatolian Plateau, and is the capital of Konya Province. During antiquity and into Seljuk times it was known as Iconium.  In 19th-century accounts of the city in English its name is usually spelt Konia or Koniah. In the late medieval period, Konya was the capital of the Seljuk Turks' Sultanate of Rum, from where they ruled over Anatolia.

As of 2021, the population of the Metropolitan Province was 2,277,017, making it the sixth most populous city in Turkey, and second most populous of the Central Anatolia Region, after Ankara. Of this, 1,390,051 lived in the three urban districts of Meram, Selçuklu and Karatay. Konya is served by TCDD high-speed train (YHT) services from Istanbul and Ankara. The local airport (Konya Havalimanı, KYA) is served by flights from Istanbul.

Etymology 
Ikónion is the Hellenisation of an older Luwian name Ikkuwaniya.

History

Overview 
The Konya region has been inhabited since the third millennium BC and fell at different times under the rule of the Hittites, the Phrygians, the Classical Greeks, the Persians and the Romans. In the 11th century the Seljuk Turks conquered the area and began ruling over its Rûm (Byzantine Greek) inhabitants, making Konya the capital of their new Sultanate of Rum. Under the Seljuks, the city reached the height of its wealth and influence. Following their demise, Konya came under the rule of the Karamanids, before being taken over by the Ottoman Empire in the 15th century. After the Turkish War of Independence the city became part of the modern Republic of Turkey.

Ancient history 

Excavations have shown that the region was inhabited during the Late Copper Age, around 3000 BC. It came under the influence of the Hittites around 1500 BC but was overrun by the Sea Peoples in around 1200 BC.

The Phrygians established their kingdom in central Anatolia in the eighth century BC and Xenophon describes Iconium (as the city was originally called) as the last city of Phrygia. The region was overwhelmed by Cimmerian invaders c. 690 BC. Later it formed part of the Persian Empire, until Darius III was defeated by Alexander the Great in 333 BC. Alexander's empire broke up shortly after his death and the town came under the rule of Seleucus I Nicator.

During the Hellenistic period the town was ruled by the kings of Pergamon. As Attalus III, the last king of Pergamon, was about to die without an heir, he bequeathed his kingdom to the Roman Republic. Once incorporated into the Roman Empire, under emperor Claudius, the city's name was changed to Claudiconium. During the reign of emperor Hadrianus it was known as Colonia Aelia Hadriana.

St Paul and Iconium 
According to the Acts of the Apostles, the apostles Paul and Barnabas preached in Iconium during their First Missionary Journey in about 47–48 AD, having been persecuted in Antioch. Their visit to the synagogue of the Jews in Iconium divided the Jewish and non-Jewish communities between those who believed Paul and Barnabas' message and those who didn't, provoking a disturbance during which attempts were made to stone the apostles. They fled to Lystra and Derbe in Lycaonia. This experience is also mentioned in the Second Letter to Timothy, and 19th-century American theologian Albert Barnes suggested that Timothy had been present with Paul in Iconium, Antioch and Lystra. Paul and Silas probably visited Konya again during Paul's Second Missionary Journey in about 50, as well as near the beginning of his Third Missionary Journey several years later. The city became the seat of a bishop, and in c. 370 was raised to the status of a metropolitan see for Lycaonia, with Saint Amphilochius as the first metropolitan bishop.

According to the apocryphal Acts of Paul and Thecla, Iconium was also the birthplace of Saint Thecla, who saved the city from attack by the Isaurians.

Under the Byzantine Empire, the city became part of the Anatolic Theme. During the eighth to tenth centuries, the town and the nearby (Caballa) Kaballah Fortress (Turkish: Gevale Kalesi) (location) were a frequent target of Arab attacks during the Arab–Byzantine wars.

Seljuk and Karamanid eras

The Seljuk Turks first raided the area in 1069, but a period of chaos overwhelmed Anatolia after the Seljuk victory in the Battle of Manzikert in 1071, and the Norman mercenary leader Roussel de Bailleul rose in revolt at Iconium. The city was finally conquered by the Seljuks in 1084. From 1097 to 1243 it was the capital of the Seljuk Sultanate of Rum. It was briefly occupied by the Crusaders Godfrey of Bouillon (August 1097), and Frederick Barbarossa (May 18, 1190) after the Battle of Iconium (1190). The area was reoccupied by the Turks after the Crusaders left.

Konya reached the height of its wealth and influence in the second half of the 12th century when the Seljuk sultans of Rum also subdued the Anatolian beyliks to their east, especially that of the Danishmends, thus establishing their rule over virtually all of eastern Anatolia,. They also acquired several port towns along the Mediterranean (including Alanya) and the Black Sea (including Sinop) and even gained a brief foothold in Sudak, Crimea. This golden age lasted until the first decades of the 13th century.

Many Persians and Persianised Turks from Persia and Central Asia migrated to Anatolian cities either to flee the invading Mongols or to benefit from the opportunities for educated Muslims in a newly established kingdom.

Following the fall of the Anatolian Seljuk Sultanate in 1307, Konya became the capital of the Karamanids, a Turkish beylik, which lasted until 1322 when the city was captured by the neighbouring Beylik of Karamanoğlu. In 1420, the Beylik of Karamanoğlu fell to the Ottoman Empire and, in 1453, Konya was made the provincial capital of the Karaman Eyalet.

Ottoman Empire 

Under Ottoman rule, Konya was administered by the Sultan's sons (Şehzade), starting with Şehzade Mustafa and Şehzade Cem (the sons of Sultan Mehmed II), and continuing with the future Sultan Selim II.

Between 1483 and 1864, Konya was the administrative capital of the Karaman Eyalet. During the reforming Tanzimat period, it became the seat of the larger Vilayet of Konya which replaced the Karaman Eyalet, as part of the new vilayet system introduced in 1864.

In 1832 Anatolia was invaded by Mehmed Ali Paşa of Kavala whose son, İbrahim Paşa, occupied Konya. Although he was driven out with the help of the European powers, Konya went into a decline after this, as described by the British traveller, William Hamilton, who visited in 1837 and found a scene 'of destruction and decay', as he recorded in his Researches in Asia Minor, Pontus and Armenia,  published in 1842.

Konya's textile and mining industries flourished under the Ottomans.

Turkish Republic 

During the Turkish War of Independence (1919–22) Konya was a major air base. In 1922, the air force, renamed as the Inspectorate of Air Forces, was headquartered in Konya.

In 1923 during the population exchange between Greece and Turkey, the Greeks of the nearby village of Sille were forced to leave as refugees and resettle in Greece.

Government 

The first local administration in Konya was founded in 1830 and converted into a municipality in 1876. In March 1989, the municipality became a Metropolitan Municipality. As of that date, Konya had three central district municipalities (Meram, Selçuklu, Karatay) and a Metropolitan Municipality.

Economy 
Home to several industrial parks. The city ranks among the Anatolian Tigers. In 2012 exports from Konya reached 130 countries. A number of Turkish industrial conglomerates, such as Bera (ex Kombassan) Holding, have their headquarters in Konya.

While agriculture-based industries play a role, the city's economy has evolved into a center for the manufacturing of components for the automotive industry; machinery manufacturing; agricultural tools; casting; plastic paints and chemicals; construction materials; paper and packaging; processed foods; textiles; and leather.

Turkey's largest solar farm is located 20 miles west of the city near Karapınar.

Geography 
Konya sits in the center of the largest province, in the largest plain (Konya Plain), and is the seventh most heavily populated city in Turkey.

The city is in the southern part of the Central Anatolia Region with the southernmost side of the province hemmed in by the Taurus Mountains.

Climate 
Konya has a cold semi-arid climate (BSk) under the Köppen classification and a temperate continental (Dc) climate under the Trewartha classification.

Summer temperatures average , although summer nights are cool. Precipitation levels are low and happen mainly in winter and spring.

Culture 

Konya has a reputation for being one of the more religiously conservative metropolitan centres in Turkey.

Konya was the final home of Rumi (Mevlana), whose turquoise-domed tomb in the city is its primary tourist attraction. In 1273, Rumi's followers established the Mevlevi Sufi order of Islam and became known as the Whirling Dervishes.

Every Saturday, there are Whirling Dervish performances (semas) at the Mevlana Cultural Centre. Unlike some of the commercial performances staged in cities like Istanbul, these are genuinely spiritual sessions.

Expensive, richly patterned Konya carpets were exported to Europe during the Renaissance and were draped over furniture to show off the wealth and status of their owners. They often crop up in contemporary oil paintings as symbols of the wealth of the painter's clients.

Attractions 

 Mevlâna Museum
 Alaaddin Mosque
 Ince Minaret Medrese—Museum
 Karatay Medrese—Museum
 Sırçalı Medrese 
 Sahib-i Ata Mosque complex
 Konya Archaeological and Ethnography Museum
 Koyunoğlu Museum
 Atatürk House Museum
 Mevlana Cultural Centre
 Mevlana Festival
 Selimiye Mosque
 Aziziye Mosque
 Konya Science Centre (Turkish: Konya Bilim Merkezi)
 Konya Tropical Butterfly Garden
Meram, suburb with popular waterside picnicking facilities
Çatalhöyük

Food
One of the city's best-known dishes, etli ekmek consists of succulently tender slices of lamb served on flaps of soft white bread. Konya is also known for unfeasibly long pides (Turkish pizzas) intended to be shared. Lucky visitors may also come across tirit, a traditional rice dish made from meat and assorted vegetables.

Konya is also known for its sweets, including cezerye, an old Turkish sweet made from carrots, and pişmaniye which is similar to American cotton candy.

Sports 

The city's football team Konyaspor is part of the Turkish Professional Football League. On May 31, 2017, they won their first national trophy, beating İstanbul Başakşehir to the Türkiye Kupası in a penalty shootout. They repeated this success on August 6, 2017, defeating Beşiktaş to win the Türkiye Süper Kupası (Turkish Superbowl).

Konya Metropolitan Stadium (Konya Büyükşehir Stadyumu)  is in the Selçuklu neighbourhood and can seat up to 42,000 spectators.

The city hosted the 2022 Islamic Solidarity Games in August 2022.

Education 
Founded in 1975, Selçuk University had the largest number of students (76,080) of any public university in Turkey during the 2008–09 academic year. The other public university, Necmettin Erbakan University, was established in Konya in 2010.

Private colleges in Konya include the KTO Karatay University.

Konya hosts the Anatolian Eagle Tactical Training Centre for training NATO Allies and friendly Air Forces.

Transportation

Intercity buses 
The central bus station has connections to a range of destinations, including Istanbul, Ankara and İzmir. It is connected to the town centre by a tram.

Inner-city public transport 
Opened in 1992, it was expanded in 1996 and 2015. The Konya Tram uses Škoda 28 T vehicles.

Work began on building a Konya Metro in 2020 and is expected to be completed in 2024 and will have 22 stations.

Konya also has an extensive inner-city bus network.

Railway 
Konya is connected to Ankara, Eskişehir, Istanbul and Karaman via the high-speed railway services of the Turkish State Railways.

Airport and airbase 
Konya Airport (KYA) is a public airport but also a military airbase used by NATO. The Third Air Wing of the 1st Air Force Command is based at the Konya Air Base. The wing controls the four Boeing 737 AEW&C Peace Eagle aircraft of the Turkish Air Force.

Notable people 

 Jalal al-Din Muhammad Rumi, also called Mawlana or Mevlana, the inspiration behind the Sufi Mevlevi order (known for the Whirling Dervishes and Masnavi). He died and was buried in Konya in 1273.
 Amphilochius of Iconium, fourth century Christian bishop.
 Prokopios Lazaridis, Greek Orthodox metropolitan bishop of the Metropolis of Iconium
 Murat Yıldırım (actor), actor and presenter
 Hilmi Şenalp (1957-), architect.

Twin towns – sister cities

Konya is twinned with:

 Bârlad, Romania
 Ganja, Azerbaijan
 Nishapur, Iran
 Al Qadarif, Sudan
 Berlin, Germany
 Sheki, Azerbaijan
 Sylhet, Bangladesh
  Kyoto, Japan
 Tetovo, North Macedonia
 Xi'an, China

See also 

 Mevlâna Museum
 Anatolian Tigers
 Konya Carpets and Rugs
 Theodosius the Cenobiarch (c. 423–529 AD), monk, abbot, and saint born in Iconium; a founder and organiser of the cenobitic way of monastic life
 Thecla or Tecla, first-century virgin saint of early Christian Church born in Iconium

Notes

References

General

Further reading 
Published in the 19th century

Published in the 20th century

Published in the 21st century

External links 

 Britannica.com: Konya

 More information about Konya
 Emporis: Database of highrises and other structures in Konya
 Detailed Pictures of Mevlana Museum
 Pictures of the city, including Mevlana Museum and several Seljuk buildings
 600 Pictures of the city and sights
 Extensive collection of pictures of the Mevlana museum in Konya
 
 
 

 
Cities in Turkey
Populated places along the Silk Road
Holy cities
World Heritage Tentative List for Turkey
Lycaonia
Populated places in ancient Lycaonia